Peteroma is a genus of moths of the family Erebidae. The genus was described by Schaus in 1901.

Species 
Peteroma albilinea Schaus, 1901 Brazil (Rio de Janeiro)
Peteroma alternata Dyar, 1912 Mexico
Peteroma carilla Schaus, 1901 Venezuela
Peteroma conita Schaus, 1901 Venezuela
Peteroma dastona Schaus, 1901 Mexico
Peteroma denticulata Dognin, 1912 Ecuador
Peteroma discisigna (Walker, [1858]) Honduras
Peteroma discopalina (Walker, 1858) Brazil (Rio de Janeiro)
Peteroma isocampta Hampson, 1926 Venezuela
Peteroma jarinta Schaus, 1901 Brazil (Rio de Janeiro)
Peteroma jonesi (H. Druce, 1898) Guatemala
Peteroma lacia (H. Druce, 1890) Panama
Peteroma laonome (H. Druce, 1890) Guatemala
Peteroma latizonata Hampson, 1926 Brazil (Rio Grande do Sul)
Peteroma lignea Schaus, 1906 Venezuela
Peteroma ligneola Dognin, 1912 Argentina (Tucuman)
Peteroma zaleodes (Hampson, 1924) Brazil (Rio de Janeiro)

References

Calpinae